AquaBounty Technologies is a biotechnology company based in Maynard, Massachusetts, United States. The company is notable for its research and development of genetically modified fish. It aims to create products that aim to increase the productivity of aquaculture. As of 2020, sale of salmon has been approved in Canada and the United States.

History 
The underlying genetic technology that accelerates the growth and reduces the time to market for the AquAdvantage salmon was developed in 1989 at Memorial University in Newfoundland, Canada.  In 2003, the first regulatory study of the fish was submitted in the U.S. to the Food and Drug Administration (FDA), who ruled that the fish were safe to eat and posed no threat to the environment when farmed in land-based aquaculture farms.  In 2012, a submission was made to Health Canada to allow the sale of the genetically modified fish in Canada and the application was subsequently approved.  AquAdvantage salmon received FDA approval in 2015 and the first U.S. harvest of salmon occurred in 2020 at their Indiana-located aquafarm. As of 2022, a production facility is in construction in Ohio.

Products
The company has developed hybrid salmon, trout, and tilapia designed to grow faster than traditional fish. Only the salmon has progressed to government (Canada, United States) approvals and are the first genetically modified animals approved for consumption.  Their hybrid Atlantic salmon incorporates a gene from a Chinook salmon, which bears a single copy of the stably integrated α-form of the opAFP-GHc2 gene construct at the α-locus in the EO-1α line (Ocean Pout AKA Eel). AquaBounty has patented and trademarked this fish as the AquAdvantage salmon, a sterile Atlantic salmon female that can grow to market size in half the time of conventional salmon.

Sales in the U.S. started May 2021.

Finances 
In 2012, a New York Times article reported the finances of AquaBounty were not in good shape and the company had to reduce staff from 27 to 12. In March 2012, AquaBounty raised US$2 million in new capital, but this would only last until the end of the year. Georgian investor Kakha Bendukidze owned 47.6% of the company's stock before selling to American synthetic biology firm Intrexon in October 2012. Intrexon put up $500,000 in bridge financing and offered to buy the rest of the company.  Intrexon acquired majority ownership of Aquabounty in 2013. In 2019 Intrexon sold Aquabounty - which continues as a publicly held company - to TS Aquaculture, LLC, a privately held company managed by Third Security, LLC, a venture capital firm led by former Intrexon Chairman & CEO Randal J. Kirk.

References

External links
 

Genetically modified organisms in agriculture
Fish farming companies
Biotechnology companies of the United States
Biotechnology companies established in 1991
Companies based in Maynard, Massachusetts
1991 establishments in Newfoundland and Labrador